Geppo is the title character of an Italian comic series created by Giovan Battista Carpi.

The character 
Geppo is a good-hearted devil, and his naive, shy, compassionate character creates the continuing problems with his "boss", Satan. Other recurring characters in the series are Satan's guard dog, Cerberus, and the anthropomorphic serpent Salvatore.

History 
Geppo officially debuted in 1955 in the comics magazine Volpetto, in the story "Vita nuova... all'inferno!" (trad. "A new life... in hell!"), but an early version of Geppo appeared in December 1954, in the comic book Trottolino e la "Enne" Dimensione (trad. Trottolino and the "N" Dimension), in the story "Geppo il buon diavolo" (trad. "Geppo the good devil"), with a different graphic design realized by Giulio Chierchini.

From 1961, Geppo became the leading character of an eponym comic book series, published for over thirty years by Edizioni Bianconi. Pier Luigi Sangalli and later Sandro Dossi alternated as authors of the comic.

Further reading 
 Alberico Motta, Pier Luigi Sangalli, Geppo, Una vita d'inferno!, IF Edizioni, 2002
 Sandro Dossi, Geppo - Inferno 2000, Andrea Leggeri, 1984–2011
 Luca Boschi, Irripetibili: le grandi stagioni del fumetto italiano, Coniglio, 2007

References 

Italian comics titles
Comics characters introduced in 1954
Italian comics characters
Comics magazines published in Italy
Magazine mascots
Fictional demons and devils
Fictional Italian people
1954 comics debuts
1995 comics endings
Humor comics
Male characters in comics
Male characters in advertising
Mascots introduced in 1954